Couque may refer to:
 Couque suisse, a pastry
 Couque de Dinant, a hard Belgian biscuit